"I'm Telling You Now" is a 1963 song by Freddie Garrity and Mitch Murray, originally performed by Freddie and the Dreamers, which, in 1965, reached number one on the American Billboard Hot 100. 

"I'm Telling You Now" was first released in the United Kingdom in August 1963 on EMI's Columbia label and went to number two in the UK Singles Chart, becoming the band's biggest hit. Two years later, Capitol's subsidiary, Tower Records, re-released the song in the United States, which propelled Freddie and the Dreamers to international stardom.

The dancing by Freddie and the band during this song spawned (via video) a minor dance fad, the Freddie.

Chart history

Weekly charts

Year-end charts

See also
Hot 100 number-one hits of 1965 (United States)

References

1963 singles
Freddie and the Dreamers songs
Billboard Hot 100 number-one singles
Cashbox number-one singles
RPM Top Singles number-one singles
Songs written by Mitch Murray
Columbia Graphophone Company singles
1963 songs

Song recordings produced by John Burgess